Andy Murray defeated Juan Martín del Potro in the final, 6–7(4–7), 7–6(7–3), 6–1 to win the men's singles tennis title at the 2009 Canadian Open.

Rafael Nadal was the defending champion, but lost in the quarterfinals to del Potro.

This was first time since 1973 on the ATP Tour that the all of the top eight ranked players advanced to the quarterfinals of a single tournament.

Seeds
The top eight seeds received a bye into the second round. All of them reached quarter-finals.

Main draw

Finals

Top half

Section 1

Section 2

Bottom half

Section 3

Section 4

Qualifying

Seeds

Qualifiers

Lucky losers

Qualifying draw

First qualifier

Second qualifier

Third qualifier

Fourth qualifier

Fifth qualifier

Sixth qualifier

Seventh qualifier

External links
Main Draw
Qualifying Draw
Andy Murray - Montreal Masters 2009 Winner

References

Masters - Singles